Hanunu (Philistine: 𐤇𐤍𐤍 *Ḥanūn; Akkadian: 𒄩𒀀𒉡𒌑𒉡 ḫa-a-nu-ú-nu), sometimes called Hanno, was the Philistine king of Gaza during the 8th century BC. During Hanunu's reign, much of the Levant, including Philistia, was controlled by the Neo-Assyrian Empire.

Assyrian conquest of the Levant 
According to the Hebrew Bible, during the mid-8th century BCE, Rezin, king of Aram-Damascus - a significant buffer state separating the Middle East from the Neo-Assyrian Empire, began forming powerful alliances with its neighboring nations, including the Kingdom of Israel. Fearing the threat posed by an Israel with Syrian military backing, the king of Judah, Ahaz, paid homage to the Neo-Assyrian king Tiglath-Pileser III, and appealed to him to invade the Levant. In the ensuing war, Aram-Damascus was annexed, many cities in Israel were captured, reducing the kingdom to a rump state, and Judah became a tributary to Assyria.

Hanunu's return to Gaza 
During the conquest, Philistia attempted to withstand the Assyrian invasion, to little success. In 734 BC, as Tiglath-Pileser III marched through the Philistine pentapolis, Hanunu realized Gaza would not hold against the Assyrian armies, and he fled to Egypt. With Gaza's capture and sacking, the Assyrians had completely conquered Philistia, and Hanunu eventually returned to Gaza, where Tiglath-Pileser III reinstated him as king. Why Hanunu returned is unclear, Tiglath-Pileser's annals record he returned because he was "overwhelmed" by the "terrifying splendor" of the Assyrian patron deity Aššur, in reality it might have been that he had expected aid from the Egyptians due to Gaza's position in their trade network, and returned once it became clear that no help was coming.

Rebellion against Assyria 
Under Assyrian rule, Gaza became a lucrative trading station, and brought Assyria's borders against Egypt's. Tiglath-Pileser's successor, Shalmaneser V, continued to spread the Empire's borders through the Middle East, eventually destroying Israel in 720 BC. During this time, Shalmaneser V was suddenly deposed by Sargon II, sending the empire into chaos. Numerous Assyrian dependencies saw opportunity in the resultant political instability and rebelled against Assyrian rule. Philistia was no exception, and Hanunu joined the other kings of Philistia in rebelling against Sargon. Despite facing concurrent rebellions in other parts of the empire, Sargon II was able to decisively crush each revolt against Assyria. By 711 BC, Gath had been destroyed, Ashdod had been conquered, and Hanunu and his armies were routed at Rafah. Following Gaza's capture, Hanunu was put in bondage and brought to Assur, his fate is unknown.

References

Philistine kings
Philistines
8th-century BC rulers
Gaza City